Hahncappsia jaliscalis is a moth in the family Crambidae. It is found in Mexico (San Luis Potosí, Jalisco).

The wingspan is about 25 mm. Adults have been recorded on wing from August to September.

References

Moths described in 1967
Pyraustinae